Amayapuram is a village located near Manapparai, in Tamil Nadu, India.

Climate
The villages in Tamil Nadu are heavily dependent on monsoon rains, and thereby are prone to droughts when the monsoons fail. The climate of the state ranges from dry sub-humid to semi-arid. The state has three distinct periods of rainfall:
 advancing monsoon period, South West monsoon from June to September, with strong southwest winds;
 North East monsoon from October to December, with dominant northeast winds;
 dry season from January to May.

Since the state is entirely dependent on rains for recharging its water resources, monsoon failures lead to acute water scarcity and severe drought.

References

Villages in Tiruchirappalli district